Mark Joseph Traynowicz (born November 20, 1962) is a former American football offensive lineman who played five seasons in the National Football League with the Buffalo Bills and Phoenix Cardinals. He was drafted by the Buffalo Bills in the second round of the 1985 NFL Draft. Traynowicz played college football at University of Nebraska–Lincoln and attended Bellevue West High School in Bellevue, Nebraska. He was a consensus All-American in 1984.

Early years
Traynowicz participated in football, wrestling and track and field at Bellevue West High School, earning nine varsity letters. In 1979, he was a first-team All-State football selection and won the Nebraska Class A state heavyweight wrestling championship with a final record of 29 wins and one loss. He also qualified for the Nebraska State Track and Field Championships in discus in 1980 and shot put from 1978 to 1980.

College career
Traynowicz earned a football scholarship to play for the Nebraska Cornhuskers. He was named first-team All-Big Eight and first-team Academic All-Big Eight his junior year. He was a first-team consensus All-American and an Academic All-American his senior year of 1984. Traynowicz was also named first-team All-Big Eight and first-team Academic All-Big Eight for the second time.

Professional career
Traynowiczwas drafted by the Buffalo Bills with the 29th pick in the 1985 NFL Draft. He signed with the Bills in July 1985.

He was traded to the Philadelphia Eagles for a conditional draft choice in 1989 on August 22, 1988. He was released on August 25, 1988.

References

External links
Just Sports Stats

Living people
1962 births
Players of American football from Nebraska
American football offensive linemen
Nebraska Cornhuskers football players
Buffalo Bills players
Phoenix Cardinals players
All-American college football players
Sportspeople from Omaha, Nebraska
People from Bellevue, Nebraska
People from Sarpy County, Nebraska